The 2022-2023 Pakistan economic crisis is an ongoing economic crisis and part of 2022-2023 political unrest in Pakistan. It has caused severe economic challenges for months due to which food, gas and oil prices have risen.

The Ukraine War has caused fuel prices to rise worldwide. Excessive external borrowings by the country over the years raised the spectre of default, causing the currency to fall and making  imports more expensive in relative terms. By June 2022, inflation was at an all time high, along with rising food prices.

Poor governance and low productivity per capita in comparison with other low to middle-income developing countries have contributed to a balance of payment crisis, where the country is unable to earn enough foreign exchange to fund the imports that it consumes.

Background

According to Indian strategic affairs specialist Sushant Sareen, Pakistan has doubled its debt roughly every five years over the last 25-year period. Starting from a debt of Rs. 3.06 trillion at the beginning of General Musharraf regime in 1999, the debt stood at Rs. 62.5 trillion at the end of the Imran Khan government in 2022. While the debt grew at around 14 percent per year on average, the GDP was growing at only 3 percent per year on average. This led to an unsustainable debt burden. In the fiscal year 2022–23, the debt servicing obligations of Rs. 5.2 trillion exceed the entire federal government revenue.

Pakistan's economic crisis was at the centre of a political standoff between Prime Minister Shahbaz Sharif and his predecessor Imran Khan in 2022, which led to Khan's ouster in April 2022. Sharif accused Khan of economic mismanagement and mishandling of the country's foreign policy, forcing him to step down in a no-confidence vote. Amid ousting, he ignited Haqeeqi Azaadi political movement which caused nationwide political unrest calling for early elections and civilian supremacy which in result worked as a catalyst for already worsening economic condition. During 2019 Imran Khan tried to make a deal with IMF and agreed with the several terms and conditions which resulted the increase in inflation but Imran Khan failed to gain IMF loan.

Timeline

2022 
Information Minister Maryam Aurangzeb told a news conference on 19 May 2022, that last month, Pakistan was committed to "controlling rising inflation, stabilizing foreign exchange reserves, strengthening the economy and reducing the country's dependence on imports". Import of unnecessary and luxury items was banned. Sharif had said at the time that the decision would "save the country's precious foreign exchange" and that Pakistan would have to "pursue austerity."

In late May 2022, the government lifted the cap on fuel prices - a condition for advancing the long-stalled bailout deal with the International Monetary Fund (IMF). IMF also insisted Islamabad to raise electricity prices, ramp up tax collection and make sizeable budget cuts.

Federal Minister for Planning and Development Ahsan Iqbal told reporters on 14 May 2022, that Pakistanis could reduce their tea consumption to "one or two cups" a day as imports were putting additional financial pressure on the government. "The tea we import is imported on credit," Iqbal said, adding that businesses should be shut down first to save electricity. According to the Observatory of Economic Complexity, the South Asian nation of 220 million is the world's largest tea importer, having bought more than $ 640 million worth of tea in 2020.

Inflation in Pakistan rose to 21.3% in June, the highest since December 2008 when inflation stood at 23.3%.

Finance Minister Miftah Ismail said that a loan of $2.3 billion from a Chinese consortium of banks had been credited to the Pakistani central bank's account in late June.

2022 Pakistan floods in summer cause over $30 billion dollars in economic losses in Pakistan.

At the end of March 2022, the State Bank of Pakistan’s reserves stood at $11.425bn, but they gradually tanked to an almost four-year low of $6.715bn on 2nd December. Pakistan’s foreign exchange reserves equal to just five weeks of merchandise imports.

The consistent depreciation of the rupee is said to be deepening the economic crisis. At the end of March, the rupee stood at 183.48 to $1. On 9th December 2022, it closed at 224.40.

2023 
In January 2023, for the first time, the CEO of Pakistan's largest bank, Habib Bank comments publicly on the prevailing economic situation. He said it could be a "big blow to the economy" if the stakeholders didn’t make the right decisions swiftly.

In late January, Pakistan lifted the artificial cap on its currency, causing the rupee to plunge 20% against the dollar in a few days. The government raised fuel prices by 16%. And the Pakistani central bank raised its interest rate by 100 basis points to battle the country’s highest inflation in decades, expected to be as high as 26% in January. Pakistan’s economy is on the brink of collapse.

In February 2023, a Moody economist predicted that inflation in Pakistan could average 33% in the first half of the year 2023. China lends Pakistan further 700 million dollars to shore up FX reserves. Pakistan's Consumer price index (CPI) further jumped to 31.5%, the highest annual rate in 50 years. 

In March, Moody's downgrades Pakistan's rating to Caa3; changes outlook to stable from negative. Finance Minister Ishaq Dar said China approved a rollover of a $1.3 billion loan for cash-strapped Pakistan, which will help shore up its depleting foreign exchange reserves. The World Bank further recorded the Consumer price index (CPI) for food items on a year on year basis at 45.1%, the second highest in South Asia after Sri Lanka.

Federal budget

On 10 June 2022, the government unveiled a new 47 billion budget for 2022-23 to persuade the IMF to resume the 6 billion bailout deal, which was agreed upon by both sides in 2019. The current debt on Pakistan is around 247 billion dollars (97% of the GDP).

Impact on industry
In October 2022, the All Pakistan Textile Mills Association (APTMA) announced that 1,600 garment mills were closed across the country due to withdrawal of power subsidies and, as a result, five million people lost their jobs. In December 2022, APTMA stated that mills across the country were running at less than 50% capacity utilization and textile exports could fall further from 2023.

A number of leading companies listed on the Pakistan Stock Exchange announced closure of plants. Car assemblers such as Pak Suzuki Motors, Toyota Indus, and Honda Atlas Cars, whose production relies completely on parts imported from other countries, shut down assembly plants after they failed to secure letters of credit due to foreign exchange curbs imposed by the government. Other notable companies to shut factories due to low demand and poor economic conditions include Millat Tractors, Ghandhara Tyre & Rubber Company, Nishat Chunian, and Fauji Fertilizer Bin Qasim.

Shortage of foreign exchange reserves and depreciation in Pakistani rupee created difficulties in importing crude oil, leading to a temporary closure of Pakistan's largest petroleum refinery–Cnergyico, in February 2023.

Delays in securing letters of credit resulted in ships and containers of pharmaceutical raw material, medicines and healthcare devices imported from other countries to be stuck at seaports for prolonged periods. Several pharmaceutical companies shut down due to "unaffordable cost of production". As a consequence, a shortage of medicines and equipment was reported across the country, forcing hospitals to postpone surgeries and treatment.

International opinion 

Chinese officials blamed West behind Pakistan’s economic crisis, and state media continues to talk about the strengths of the China-Pakistan Economic Corridor. “Only China has given a full plan. From this perspective, it is the Western world that ‘abandoned’ Pakistan, and China is the one that extended a helping hand. And if Pakistan wants complete self-help, it cannot completely rely on China, it still has to fight for itself,” wrote Liu Qingbin, senior researcher at the China Digital Economy Institute.

The US has expressed serious concerns about Pakistan’s debt to China. “We have been very clear about our concerns not just here in Pakistan, but elsewhere all around the world about Chinese debt, or debt owed to China,” said US State Department Counselor Derek Chollet during his visit to Islamabad on 15 February 2023.

See also
 Economic impact of the 2022 Russian invasion of Ukraine
 Economy of Pakistan

References

2022 in economics
2023 in economics
Economic crisis
Economic crisis
2022–2023
Economic crises